Bulăiești is a commune and village in Orhei District, Moldova.

References

Communes of Orhei District